Air Dynasty Heli Service Pvt. Ltd. is a helicopter airline based at Tribhuvan International Airport in Kathmandu, Nepal, operating chartered helicopter services. The company was established in 1993 and mainly carries out domestic chartered helicopter flights throughout Nepal from its three hubs in Kathmandu, Pokhara, and Lukla.

History 
Air Dynasty was founded in 1993 in Kathmandu, Nepal, by Ang Tshering Sherpa. In 2001, the airline received a foreign direct investment from British businessman Malcom Roy Smith, who held 50% of the airline and served as the chairman. In 2005, the airline partnered with the Bhutanese flag carrier Druk Air, to which a Eurocopter helicopter was leased, after the government of Bhutan decided to introduce helicopter charter services in the country.
In 2013, the European Commission banned all Nepalese airlines from entering European airspace. This restriction is still in place as of January 2023 and specifically also regards Air Dynasty.

Fleet

Current fleet
The Air Dynasty fleet consists of these aircraft (as of May 2019):

Former fleet

Accidents and incidents 
 26 September 2013 – An Air Dynasty Eurocopter AS 350 helicopter crashed after landing at Lukla Airport. The helicopter's tail touched a fence, causing it to crash. All four people on board escaped the accident alive, but the aircraft was written off.
27 February 2019 – An Airbus H125 crashed in Taplejung while operating a charter flight. None of the seven persons on board, including Nepal's tourism minister, Rabindra Prasad Adhikari, survived.

References

External links
 

Airlines of Nepal
Helicopter airlines
Airlines established in 1993
1993 establishments in Nepal